Smoke is an album by White Williams, released on November 6, 2007 by Tigerbeat6. The album was independently recorded in multiple living spaces over two years in Cleveland, Cincinnati, New York, and San Francisco.

Track listing
 "Headlines"
 "In the Club"
 "New Violence"
 "Going Down"
 "Smoke"
 "The Shadow"
 "Danger"
 "I Want Candy"
 "Fleetwood Crack"
 "Route to Palm"
 "Lice in the Rainbow"

Notes 

2007 albums